Madea's Family Reunion is a 2006 American comedy-drama film and an adaptation of the stage production of the same name written by Tyler Perry. The film is a sequel to Diary of a Mad Black Woman. It was written, directed by, and starring Perry with the rest of the cast consisting of Blair Underwood, Lynn Whitfield, Boris Kodjoe, Henry Simmons, Lisa Arrindell Anderson, Maya Angelou, Rochelle Aytes, Jenifer Lewis, Tangi Miller, Keke Palmer, and Cicely Tyson. The film tells the story of Madea preparing for an upcoming family reunion while dealing with the dramas before and during it. It was released on February 24, 2006, nearly one year following its predecessor, Diary of a Mad Black Woman. The independent film was produced by Lionsgate.

Madea's Family Reunion received mixed-to-negative reviews from critics, but was a box office success, grossing $63.4 million worldwide against a $6 million budget.

Plot
After Madea (Tyler Perry) violates the terms of the house arrest she was subjected to in the previous film in order to get Joe (Tyler Perry) some medicine, Judge Mablean Ephriam orders her to take in a rebellious foster child named Nikki (Keke Palmer) in order to avoid jail as Brian (Tyler Perry) states that Madea will make a good foster mother. At first, Madea and Nikki clash due to the latter's bad attitude and disrespect, stemming from her poor life up to this point, including an absent father, a mother in jail, and a slew of uncaring foster homes. However, Madea tells her that the only way to really overcome her poor life is to work hard and strive to be better than the people who wronged her. Nikki takes Madea's words to heart and gradually reforms her behavior.

Lisa Breaux (Rochelle Aytes), one of Madea's grand-nieces, is engaged to Carlos Armstrong (Blair Underwood), an abusive and controlling investment banker. While Lisa desperately wants to get out of the engagement, her conniving gold-digging mother Victoria (Lynn Whitfield) urges her to go through with the wedding, coordinated by Milay (Jenifer Lewis), telling Lisa to avoid doing things that make Carlos angry. Vanessa (Lisa Arrindell Anderson), Lisa's older sister and the other of Madea's grand-nieces, who lives with her, has two children fathered by two different men, neither of whom are involved in their children's lives; Victoria regularly degrades Vanessa for this, even referring to her grandchildren as "bastards". With some effort, Vanessa is successfully wooed by poetry-spouting bus driver Frankie Henderson (Boris Kodjoe), who is the single father of a young son, and has a passion for painting. As much as Vanessa likes Frankie, she is emotionally closed-off and has a difficult time trusting him.
 
Lisa eventually leaves Carlos, with the intention of calling off the wedding, temporarily moving in with Madea. Carlos, eager to move forward with the wedding, dispatches Victoria to bring Lisa back to him. Victoria confronts Carlos about the abuse, suggesting that insecurity about his masculinity is causing him to act out and that he needs counseling. Carlos counters this by suggesting that Victoria is controlling every aspect of her daughter's life because she wants to make up for all of the shortcomings in her own. It is then revealed that Victoria, with Carlos's assistance, has stolen from Lisa's trust fund over the years, leaving virtually no money left, and is now encouraging Lisa to marry Carlos in order to keep up her livelihood. Carlos makes it clear to Victoria that he will not bail her out unless the wedding goes forward.

Victoria goes to Madea's house to fetch Lisa, only to end up in a passionate argument with Vanessa, who has become aware of Carlos's abuse and is eager to protect her sister. During the confrontation, Vanessa reveals a shocking secret to her younger sister: Victoria allowed her second husband, Lisa's father, to rape Vanessa in order to keep him in the marriage. Vanessa states that the sexual abuse occurred on a regular basis after that, which as a result, left her closed-off emotionally and unable to trust the men in her life, including Frankie. Even more shockingly, Victoria makes no attempt to deny Vanessa's accusations. Instead, she rationalizes her actions, telling her daughters that they would have been destitute if Lisa's father had left, and that after going through a previous divorce with Vanessa's father and working two jobs to support the family afterwards, she was tired of struggling and felt that she deserved better. She also reveals that her own mother, a prostitute and drug addict, regularly traded her for "ten dollars and a fix", essentially almost mirroring what she'd done with Vanessa and Lisa's father. Victoria then states that she would not allow Vanessa to ruin her happiness, and that she would not apologize for the choices she'd made. She then turns on a horrified Lisa, demanding that Lisa begin taking care of her financially as she made sure that Lisa had the best of everything while she was growing up. Vanessa then derides Victoria for constantly controlling her and Lisa as her punching bag and puppet, respectively, and how it has left her a mess; she vows not to let the pain and suffering her mother has subjected her to over the years hold her back any longer, and to break their family's tragic cycle by embracing the true love that she has found with Frankie and being a better mother to her own children. Victoria then leaves and later lies to Lisa, telling her that Carlos has agreed to counseling.

At the family reunion held at the home of 96-year-old Aunt Ruby (Georgia Allen), Vanessa and Victoria get into another verbal confrontation, which eventually turns into a physical fight after Victoria insults Vanessa regarding her relationship with Frankie. Then, Victoria screams at the top of her lungs, in front of the entire reunion, that she never loved Vanessa. Punches are thrown by both women. The fight is broken up when Aunt Ruby, Madea's daughter-in-law Myrtle (Cicely Tyson), and Ruby's daughter Aunt May (Maya Angelou) gather the family members to an old slave shack where the family's ancestors grew up. Ruby express disappointment at how the family has turned out. Myrtle gives a long speech, persuading them to act lovingly towards each other and themselves.

Lisa eventually returns to Carlos and resumes her wedding plans. On the day of Lisa's wedding, Madea tells her that it is time for her to stand up to Carlos and fight back. When he arrives at Madea's house, he asks that he and Lisa be alone. Madea asks Carlos if he'd like something to eat, and tells Lisa to give him some grits on the stove, noting to her that they're hot. When Madea leaves the house with Nikki and Joe, Carlos brutally slaps Lisa in the face. In retaliation, she throws the pot of hot grits in his face, scalding him badly, then beats him with a cast iron frying pan as Madea listens outside with laughter. Lisa takes off her engagement ring and throws it at an injured Carlos before leaving.

At the church, Lisa announces to the family members and other guests that Carlos had been beating her every day since they first got engaged and that the wedding is off. Victoria sarcastically states to Lisa that she feels sorry for her, but Madea states that everyone here feels sorry for Victoria and tells her to find her own life instead of continuing to live through Lisa. As Milay expresses disappointment that her work will now be wasted, Frankie then asks Vanessa to marry him. She says yes and they're married at the church instead.

At the reception, Victoria tells Vanessa that she and Frankie are a beautiful couple and they hug, signifying the first steps in a possible reconciliation.

Cast

 Tyler Perry as:
 Mabel "Madea" Simmons, a tough old lady.
 Joe Simmons, the brother of Madea.
 Brian Simmons, a lawyer who is the son of Joe and the nephew of Madea.
 Blair Underwood as Carlos Armstrong, a controlling investment banker who is loosely based on Ronnie from the stage play.
 Lynn Whitfield as Victoria Breaux, a gold-digging woman and a niece of Madea.
 Boris Kodjoe as Frankie Henderson, a bus driver who is also a poet, and later marries Vanessa. 
 Henry Simmons as Isaac, a nephew of Madea who is antagonized by Joe when he was repairing Madea's lawnmower.
 Lisa Arrindell Anderson as Vanessa Breaux-Henderson, the grand-niece of Madea and daughter of Victoria who falls for Frankie after two bad relationships, and eventually marries him.
 Maya Angelou as Aunt May, a cousin of Madea.
 Rochelle Aytes as Lisa Breaux, the grand-niece of Madea and daughter of Victoria who is to be engaged to Carlos.
 Jenifer Lewis as Milay Jenay Lori, a wedding planner.
 Keke Palmer as Nikki Grady, a girl who Madea takes in.
 Tangi Miller as Donna, the love interest of Isaac and sister of Brian.
 Cicely Tyson as Aunt Myrtle, Madea's daughter-in-law
 China Anderson as Nima, the daughter of Vanessa.
 Akhil Jackson as Jonathan, the son of Vanessa and the younger half-brother of Nima.
 Alonzo Millsap as Tre, the son of Frankie.
 Georgia Allen as Aunt Ruby, a 96-year-old aunt of Madea who is the mother of May and Sarah.
 Cassi Davis as Aunt Sarah, a cousin of Madea and the sister of May.
 Leon Lamar as Grover, a cousin of Madea and Joe.
 John Lawhorn as Uncle Pete, a cousin of Madea and Joe.
 Afemo Omilami as Isaac Sr., the father of Isaac and cousin of Madea and Joe.
 Mablean Ephriam as Herself
 Deanna Dawn as Tyrequa
 Enoch King as Hykeem
 Jennifer Sears as an unnamed female at the family reunion.
 Tre Rogers as an unnamed young man at the family reunion.
 Elizabeth Omilami as Aunt Clara, a relative of Madea.
 Nicholas Ortiz as Himself
 Johnny Gill as a wedding singer
 David Wiebers as Wedding Trumpeter
 China Anne McClain as Youth (uncredited)

Soundtrack
The soundtrack was released by Motown Records on February 21, 2006.

Release and reception

Box office
Madea's Family Reunion was budgeted at $6 million and opened at #1 in its opening weekend (2/24-26) with $30,030,661 and eventually grossed $63,257,940 in North America with an additional $50,939 internationally, tying $63,308,879 worldwide after 9 weeks in theaters.

Small independent filmmaker Tyler Perry has garnered one of the highest wide-release openings to date in 2006, in both gross ($30 million) and screen average ($13,687).

"The number one movie is Madea's Family Reunion, a small comedy/melodrama which grossed an astounding $30.3 million from 2,194 venues. It had a super-hot venue average of $13,787...."

"Playing at 2,194 locations across North America, the film averaged a remarkable estimated $13,788 per screen, demonstrating the enormous breadth and depth of Perry's audience. The debut weekend of Madea's Family Reunion outperformed the opening weekend of Lionsgate's first Tyler Perry film, Diary of a Mad Black Woman, by nearly 40 percent." To illustrate the point, Lions Gate's exit polls showed 52 percent of the audience were black women over the age of 35.

Critical response
On Rotten Tomatoes it has an approval rating of 26%, based on 58 reviews, with an average rating of 4.50/10. The site's consensus reads "Tyler Perry's Madea's Family Reunion is sincere in its positive intentions, but leaves something to be desired as a film." On Metacritic, it has a score of 45% based on reviews from 18 critics, indicating "mixed or average reviews". Audiences polled by CinemaScore gave the film an A grade.

References

External links

 
 

2006 films
2006 romantic comedy-drama films
Films set in Georgia (U.S. state)
Films shot in Atlanta
Films about domestic violence
American romantic comedy-drama films
Films directed by Tyler Perry
African-American films
American sequel films
Lionsgate films
Films with screenplays by Tyler Perry
2006 directorial debut films
2006 comedy films
2006 drama films
2000s English-language films
2000s American films